Jonesboro High School is a four-year public high school located in Jonesboro, Georgia, United States. The school is part of the Clayton County School District, and is located at 7728 Mt. Zion Boulevard.

The school's teams are known as the Cardinals, and the school colors are red, white, and black. U.S. News & World Report selected Jonesboro as one of the top 100 schools in the United States in its December 1998 issue. The school has produced several notable alumni.

Established as a public high school on September 21, 1891, Jonesboro High School was originally located on College Street. The school was moved to Spring Street during the Christmas break of 1917 and moved again to its present location on the corner of Mt. Zion Boulevard in the fall of 1963.

Campus
The library originally started out in what is now the ROTC room and was moved into its own building in 1968. In 1975 the vocational building was completed, giving JHS the chance to expand it faculty to include assistant principals, counselors, and vocational teachers. A technology lab was added in the 1994–95 school year.

Jonesboro High School underwent construction starting the 2006–07 school year for the addition of a freshman wing. The wing was complete for use in the 2007–2008 school year, and opened in February 2008. This addition cost the county a total of $4,025,593. The school is getting an auxiliary gymnasium. The work began on June 15, 2010, and the date of opening is unknown. The addition of this new building is costing the county an estimated $2,250,000.

Awards and recognition
Jonesboro High School won the 2007 National High School Mock Trial Championship, held in Dallas, Texas and again in 2008 in Wilmington, Delaware.

Notable alumni
 Harry Douglas, NFL wide receiver for the Tennessee Titans
 Toney Douglas (born 1986), basketball player for Hapoel Eilat of the Israeli Basketball Premier League
 Steve Lundquist, swimmer; won two Olympic gold medals at the 1984 Summer Olympics in Los Angeles, California (1979)
 Jason Perry, former MLB outfielder
 Cameron Sutton, NFL cornerback for the Pittsburgh Steelers

References

External links

Clayton County Public Schools website

Schools in Clayton County, Georgia
Public high schools in Georgia (U.S. state)
Educational institutions established in 1891
1891 establishments in Georgia (U.S. state)